Nymfasia (before 1927: Γρανίτσα - Granitsa) is a village in the municipal unit of Vytina, Arcadia, Greece.  In 2011, it had a population of 114. It sits at 1,000 m above sea level, at the foot of the Mainalo mountains. It is 2 km north of Vytina and 10 km west of Levidi.

Population

See also

List of settlements in Arcadia

External links
Nymfasia at the GTP Travel Pages

References

Populated places in Arcadia, Peloponnese
Vytina